Cold Coffee is the debut studio album by the Scottish singer-songwriter Barrie-James O'Neill, released on 8 April 2016 by Acid Bird. The album was recorded in June 2015 in Los Angeles, California, United States. It was tracked, mixed, and mastered in 13 days. It was written and composed by O'Neill. Rob Schnapf served as the album producer and mixer. Scottie Diablo as A&R and Executive Producer.  Cold Coffee was preceded by the digital release of five singles, "Mary", "Chivalry Is Alive And Well And Living In Glasgow", "Angel Tears", "Way Over My Head" and "Night Burns".

Promotion

Songs
"Mary" was released as the album's first promotional single on 14 February 2014. The music video was released on 31 October 2013

"Chivalry Is Alive And Well And Living In Glasgow"  was released as the album's second promotional single on 16 March 2015. The music video was released on 27 January 2015.

Singles
"Angel Tears" was released as the album's official single on 11 March 2016

The music video for "Way Over My Head" was released on 10 October 2014. It was released as a single on 4 April 2016.

"Night Burns" was released as a single on 10 April 2016.

Track listing

Personnel 

Scottie Diablo - A&R, Executive Producer, Project Manager, Art Direction, Artist Management
Rob Schnapf - Album Producer, Mixing 
Brian Rosemeyer - Engineer
Mark Chalecki - Mastering
 Solomon Walker - Upright Bass
Barrie-James O'Neill -  Vocals, Guitar, Piano, Mellotron, Drums, Bass Guitar
Rob Schnapf - Lap Steel, Guitar, Mellotron
 Nathaniel Walcott - Trumpet (track 6)
 Juanita Stein - Backing vocals (track 12)
Scottie Diablo, Rob Schnapf, Barrie-James O'Neill - Gang Handclaps (track 6)

References

2016 debut albums